Sonja Lehmann (born 13 September 1979) is a German field hockey player. She was born in Berlin. She won a gold medal at the 2004 Summer Olympics in Athens.

She played for TuS Lichterfelde Berlin. In 2008, she married hockeyplayer Bastian Dittberner.

References

External links

1979 births
Living people
Field hockey players from Berlin
German female field hockey players
Olympic field hockey players of Germany
Field hockey players at the 2004 Summer Olympics
Olympic gold medalists for Germany
Olympic medalists in field hockey
Medalists at the 2004 Summer Olympics
21st-century German women